Halford Edward Luccock (1885–1960) was a prominent American Methodist minister and professor of homiletics at Yale Divinity School.

His statements in his sermon "Keeping Life Out of Confusion", at the Riverside Church in New York City on 11 September 1938, have been widely quoted. He declared: 

This was reported  the next day in an article headlined  "Disguised Fascism Seen As A Menace" in The New York Times.

Other long quoted remarks on the significance of Christmas occurred in his earlier 1915 essay "Everything Upside Down". He later elaborated upon this work in an extended adaptation, "Whoops! It’s Christmas" in 1959, which was published in The Abbott Christmas Book in 1960.

He wrote a column in The Christian Century for many years under the pseudonym "Simeon Stylites".

References

External links

 The Acts of the Apostles in Present Day Preaching (1942)
 Preaching Values in the Epistles of Paul Volume I (1959)
 Halford Luccock at The Online Books Page
 Works by Luccock at the Internet Archive
 Books by Luccock at Library Thing

1885 births
1960 deaths
20th-century American male writers
20th-century American non-fiction writers
20th-century Methodist ministers
American male non-fiction writers
American Methodist clergy
American religious writers
Arminian ministers
Arminian writers
Yale Divinity School faculty